Clarkson's Car Years is a British television series presented by Jeremy Clarkson and first shown during June and July 2000 on BBC Two, before being shown to an international audience on BBC World. Since 2008, it has regularly been repeated on various UKTV channels.

Over the series, Clarkson discusses six different topics relating to motoring, looking at the defining moments of each. The show was produced by BBC Birmingham and executively produced by Richard Pearson. Car Years was the first of two series involving Clarkson which were filmed during his hiatus from Top Gear, and his third documentary series for the BBC, following Motorworld and Extreme Machines.

Episode list

References

External links
Supercar crash halts Clarkson show
Episode list on IMDB

BBC television documentaries
BBC World News shows
2000 British television series debuts
2000 British television series endings
2000s British documentary television series
Driving in the United Kingdom